Bow is a town in Merrimack County, New Hampshire, United States. The population was 8,229 at the 2020 census, up from 7,519 at the 2010 census, an increase of 9.4%.

History 
The town was granted by the authorities of New Hampshire to Jonathan Wiggin and others in 1727, and was originally  square, covering nearly all the territory granted to Ebenezer Eastman and others by the authorities of Massachusetts two years previous, under the name of "Pennacook" (now Concord). Massachusetts claimed to hold authority over a large portion of the territory of New Hampshire for many years, until the final boundary line was established in 1741, giving New Hampshire more territory than it had ever claimed. These complicated lines of the two towns coming from two different authorities were not settled decisively till after the final separation of the two colonial provinces. The government of New Hampshire gave Bow the preference in its grant of 1727, and did not recognize the title of the Pennacook grantees, and in the bill giving a charter for the parish of Concord, it was worded as "taking a part of the town of Bow," etc. Although Concord was granted and surveyed before Bow, its final organization was 38 years after it. Bow gained a victory over Concord in its original title; still it was obliged to yield over two-thirds of its territory to Concord, Pembroke and Hopkinton, establishing their final boundary lines at different times, from 1759 to 1765.

The town's name comes from its establishment along a bend, or "bow", in the Merrimack River. The first census, taken in 1790, reported 568 residents.

In 1874, the Concord Railroad passed along the eastern border of Bow. It is now the New England Southern Railroad.

On September 28, 2019, hundreds of climate activists protested in Bow against Merrimack Station, one of the last remaining coal-fired power plants in New England. 67 people, who carried buckets signifying their intent to physically remove coal from the site, were arrested by state police.

Geography 
Nearby Wood Hill and Brown Hill also top . Bow lies fully within the Merrimack River watershed. The Merrimack River forms the northeast border of the town.

Adjacent municipalities 
 Concord (north)
 Pembroke (northeast)
 Allenstown (east)
 Hooksett (southeast)
 Dunbarton (southwest)
 Hopkinton (northwest)

Demographics 

At the 2000 census there were 7,138 people in 2,304 households, including 2,045 families, in the town.  The population density was 254.3 people per square mile (98.2/km).  There were 2,330 housing units at an average density of 83.0 per square mile (32.0/km).  The racial makeup of the town was 97.79% White, 0.13% African American, 0.10% Native American, 1.04% Asian, 0.29% from other races, and 0.66% from two or more races. Hispanic or Latino of any race were 0.49%.

For the 2015-2019 period, the median household income was $122,230. The per capita income for the town was $48,900.  About 2.0% of families and 1.8% of the population were below the poverty line, including 0.6% of those under age 18 and 4.2% of those age 65 or over.

Of the 2,304 households 49.1% had children under the age of 18 living with them, 81.0% were married couples living together, 5.9% had a female householder with no husband present, and 11.2% were non-families. 8.6% of households were one person and 3.6% were one person aged 65 or older.  The average household size was 3.10 and the average family size was 3.28.

The age distribution was 32.6% under the age of 18, 4.4% from 18 to 24, 27.3% from 25 to 44, 27.2% from 45 to 64, and 8.4% 65 or older.  The median age was 39 years. For every 100 females, there were 99.5 males.  For every 100 females age 18 and over, there were 93.7 males.

Politics and government 
Bow is a part of New Hampshire's 2nd congressional district, and is currently represented by Democrat Ann McLane Kuster (D-Hopkinton). In the New Hampshire Senate, Bow is a part of New Hampshire's 16th State Senate district, currently represented by Democrat Kevin Cavanaugh (D-Manchester). In the New Hampshire House of Representatives, Bow shares multi-member district Merrimack 23 with the neighboring town of Dunbarton, and Democrats currently hold 3/3 seats of the district.

Like many suburban communities in southeastern New Hampshire, Bow historically leaned Republican. Over the past decade Democrats have improved, with Hillary Clinton and Joe Biden greatly exceeding their statewide margins of victory in the town.

Transportation 
Two New Hampshire State Routes and two Interstate Highways cross Bow.

NH 3A enters from Hooksett in the south, closely paralleling the Merrimack River and I-93 before leaving in the north into Concord.
NH 13 crosses the narrow salient in the extreme northwestern corner of town.  It connects to Dunbarton in the west and Concord in the east.
Interstate 93 is a freeway that crosses the town from south to north, connecting Hooksett to Concord.  There are no exits on I-93 to directly access the town of Bow, though one may use I-89 and exit at Logging Hill Road, or access NH 3A in Concord just north of the town line.
Interstate 89 ends in Bow at the interchange with I-93 in the extreme northeastern corner of town a few hundred yards south of the Concord city line; the roadway continues for a short distance after the end of I-89 to provide access to NH 3A.  There is one additional exit along I-89 to access Logging Hill Road.

Education
In 1997, Bow built its first high school, Bow High School, along Turee Pond. Bow Memorial School (the middle school) and Bow Elementary School are located on Bow Center Road, less than a mile from the high school.

Notable people 

 Jamie Aube (born 1953), NASCAR driver
 Mary Baker Eddy (1821–1910), founder of the Church of Christ, Scientist; born in Bow
 Sam Knox (1910–1981), American football player
 John Ordway (1775–1817), member of the Lewis and Clark Expedition
 Caleb Scofield (1978–2018), bassist/vocalist for Cave In, Old Man Gloom, Zozobra
 Dick Swett (born 1957), former U.S. representative

References

External links 
 
 New Hampshire Economic and Labor Market Information Bureau Profile
 Bow Open Spaces, non-profit group dedicated to stewardship of forests and conserved lands, some with trails, in Bow

 
Towns in Merrimack County, New Hampshire
Towns in New Hampshire
New Hampshire populated places on the Merrimack River